Ian Hampton (born 30 July 1942) is a New Zealand cricketer. He played in fourteen first-class matches for Central Districts from 1962 to 1966.

See also
 List of Central Districts representative cricketers

References

External links
 

1942 births
Living people
New Zealand cricketers
Central Districts cricketers
Cricketers from Motueka